Villazanzo de Valderaduey is a municipality located in the province of León, Castile and León, Spain. According to the 2004 census (INE), the municipality had a population of 665 inhabitants.

Villages in the municipality 
  
  
  
  
 
 
 
 
 Villazanzo de Valderaduey

See also
Tierra de Campos

References

Municipalities in the Province of León